Billboard Mashup Mondays was an American live music web series created by Billboard, distributed on their website. The series premiered on February 22, 2010.
Each Monday, "artists cover unexpected songs"
Starburst was the presenting sponsor.
At the end of the second season, there was an online vote for the favorite video, followed by a "post-season" of five episodes.

One reviewer said "some weeks we get inspired performances like Janelle Monae singing “Smile”, and other weeks we get Iyaz turning Green Day into bad karaoke".

Episodes

Season 1 (2010)

Season 2 (2011)

References

External links
 

American non-fiction web series